"Lluvia de primavera", released in America as "Spring Rain", is an instrumental composition by Bebu Silvetti.

Chart performance
Released in 1975 the single did not receive airplay and chart in the USA until January 1977 when, driven by popularity in discos, it peaked at #39 in the Bllboard Hot 100 chart the week of March 19, 1977, joining the list of 1970s one-hit wonders in the United States. In the US, on the National Disco Action Top 40 chart, "Spring Rain" went to #4. "Spring Rain" was also a hit on the Easy Listening chart, peaking at #13.

The single charted in South Africa in June 1977 at #4. The album version is longer than the original 1975 single version, which covered only the Hispavox A-side, with "Travel Check" on the B-side. In March 1977 Polydor Germany issued the album version split over 2 x 7" sides for discotheque use as "Spring Rain Part I / Part II".

TV themes
The tune was used as the theme of the short-lived 1978-79 syndicated game/talk hybrid show The Love Experts (hosted by Bill Cullen at the time), the 1978 pilot of Mind Readers (hosted by Geoff Edwards at the time).
The 1984 pilot of Jackpot! (hosted by Nipsey Russell at the time).
The Big Spin.

Popular culture
The single has been reissued on many compilations, such as Salsoul Jam 2000.

Many radio stations used this instrumental piece as well as its B-side Traffic Check as a station or program jingle, or as a filler.

Samples
"Spring Rain" has been sampled on songs including: Shangri-La (Denki Groove song), and Helter Stupid.

References

Songs about weather
Disco songs
1975 songs
1977 singles
Songs written by Bebu Silvetti